Ivanovskoye is a rural locality (a selo) and the administrative center of Ivanovskoye Rural Settlement, Ilyinsky District, Perm Krai, Russia. The population was 384 as of 2010. There are 14 streets.

References 

Rural localities in Perm Krai